Charoun is a village of Munger district in the Indian state of Bihar. It is situated 7 km from Munger city center. Charoun is a part of the Munger-Jamalpur twin cities.

Geography

The city is in the Munger district. Charoun is an overnight rail or road journey from Kolkata.

The nearest international airport is Netaji Subhas Chandra Bose International Airport in Kolkata,  from Charoun on NH80.

Demographics
As of the 2011 census Charoun has a population of 2,254, with a ratio of 871 females for every 1,000 males. The average literacy rate is 87.38%; for men it is 92.58%, and for women it is 81.40%. There are 398 children in charoun aged 0 to 5, with a ratio of 867 girls for every 1,000 boys.

List of cities in Bihar

References 

Villages in Munger district
Cities and towns in Anga Desh